The following are lists of candidates in the 2004 U.S. presidential election. Candidates who were not on any state ballots, withdrew from the race, suspended their presidential campaign, or failed to earn their party's nomination are listed separately.

Party nominees
All candidates in the table below were on the ballot in multiple states.  Those who were on the ballot in enough states to win a majority in the U.S. Electoral College are marked in bold.  Candidates who were on the ballot in no more than one state are listed in the next section.

Ballot access
The two major parties in the United States are the Democratic and the Republican parties which are on the ballot in all fifty States and the District of Columbia.

The table below shows which third-party candidates were able to gain ballot access in each State. In some States, these candidates were on the ballot as independents, or on the ballot lines of different parties (for example, in Michigan the Socialist Party USA candidate received the Natural Law Party's ballot line.)

The Socialist Workers Party's official ticket could not be listed on the ballot in some states because Calero and Hawkins were both ineligible to be President, as Calero was not a native-born citizen and Hawkins was too young.  In such states the party used their 2000 ticket of James Harris and Margaret Trowe (JH).

The Prohibition Party suffered a schism in 2003. Long-time Presidential candidate Earl Dodge was the nominee of one faction, while Gene Amondson was the nominee of the other. Both factions were on the ballot in Colorado, with only Amondson on the ballot in Louisiana.

Candidates who had enough potential electoral votes to win the presidency

Other third party candidates

Other candidates
The tickets below were on the ballot in no more than one state. Those who appeared on a single state's ballot are in bold, all others were write-in candidates. Those without party labels were independents. Some did not have vice-presidential candidates.
A. J. Albritton (American Republican Party—Mississippi)
Sterling Allan (Providential Party—Utah)
Stanford E. "Andy" Andress/Irene M. Deasy (Colorado)
Lawson M. Bone (Tennessee)
Kenneth M. Bonnell (Mississippi)
Robert A. Boyle II (Maryland)
Harry Braun (Arizona)
Theodis "Ted" Brown, Sr. (Missouri)
Michael Massa/Ned Stanley (Chaminade Party-Missouri)
Fred Cook (Georgia)
Eric J. Davis (Michigan)
Robert DiGiulio (Children's Party—Vermont)
Bob Dorn (Washington)
Lonnie D. Frank (California)
Ronald "John Galt Jr." Gascon (Pennsylvania)
Jack Grimes (United Fascist Union—Pennsylvania)
Michael Halpin (New York)
Thomas Harens/Jennifer Ryan (Christian Freedom Party—Minnesota)
Larry D. Hines (Texas)
Georgia Hough (Georgia)
Charles Jay/Marilyn Chambers (Personal Choice—Utah)
Keith Judd (Massachusetts)
Darren E. Karr (Party X—Oregon)
Samuel Keegan (Rhode Island)
John Joseph Kennedy (Georgia)
Tom Laughlin
Joseph Martyniuk Jr. (Illinois)
David Mevis (Mississippi)
Muadin (E-Democratic Party—Massachusetts)
Leonard Peltier/Janice Jordan (Peace and Freedom—California)
Jeffrey Peters (We the People Party—New Hampshire)
Andrew M. Rotramel (Texas)
Joseph "Average Joe" Schriner (Ohio)
Dennis P. Slatton (United America Party—North Carolina)
Dan Snow (Texas)
Brian B. Springfield (Virginia)
Diane Templin (American Party—California)
Lawrence Rey Topham (Utah)
Lemuel Tucker (Michigan)
Da Vid (Light Party—California)
Tom Wells (Family Values Party—Florida)
A. J. Wildman (Virginia)

Although Guam has no votes in the Electoral College, they have held a straw poll for their presidential preferences since 1980. In 2004, the results were Bush 21,490 (64.1%), Kerry 11,781 (35.1%), Nader 196 (0.58%) and Badnarik 67 (0.2%).

Primary and convention candidates

Blake Ashby (Republican)
Katherine Bateman (Democratic)
Sheila Bilyeu (Green)
Dick Bosa (Republican)
Carol Moseley Braun (Democratic)
Harry Braun (Democratic)
John Buchanan (Republican)
Michael Callis (Republican)
Peter Camejo (Green)
Willie Carter (Democratic)
Jeanne Chebib (Democratic)
Eric Chester (Socialist)
Wesley Clark (Democratic)
Randy Crow (Democratic)
Howard Dean (Democratic)
Jeffrey Diket (Libertarian)
Gerry Dokka (Democratic)
Don Doumakes (Socialist)
John Edwards (Democratic)
John A. Estrada (Democratic)
Richard Gephardt (Democratic)
Mildred Glover (Democratic)
Paul Glover (Green)
George Gostigian (Republican)
Bob Graham (Democratic)
Robert Haines (Republican)
Vincent Hamm (Democratic)
Mark Harnes (Republican)
Mildred Howard (Republican)
Caroline Killeen (Democratic)
Dennis Kucinich (Democratic)
Lyndon LaRouche (Democratic)
Tom Laughlin (Republican)
Randy Lee (Democratic)
Joe Lieberman (Democratic)
Robert Linnell (Democratic)
Bill McGaughey (Democratic)
Kent Mesplay (Green)
Carol Miller (Green)
Gary Nolan (Libertarian)
Cornelius O'Connor (Republican)
Edward O'Donnell (Democratic)
Fern Penna (Democratic)
Rubén Pérez (Libertarian)
John Rigazio (Republican)
Aaron Russo (Libertarian)
Lorna Salzman (Green)
Al Sharpton (Democratic)
Vermin Supreme (Democratic)
Leonard Talbow (Democratic)
Jim Taylor. (Republican)
Florence Walker (Democratic)
Lisa Weltman (Socialist)
Lucian Wojciechowski (Democratic)
Bill Wyatt (Republican)

See also
List of candidates in the United States presidential election, 2008

References

External links
Ballot Access News
Politics1—Presidency 2004

United States presidential election candidates
United States presidential election candidates, 2004
 
2004